The 2017 UK Seniors Championship was a senior snooker tournament, that took place at the Harlequin Theatre in Redhill, England, from 24 to 26 October 2017. It was a first stage of the newly created World Seniors Tour.

The Championship was won by Jimmy White who beat Ken Doherty 4–2 in the final.

Prize fund
The breakdown of prize money is shown below:
Winner: £7,500
Runner-up: £2,500
Semi-finals: £1,000
Quarter-finals: £500
Highest break: £500
Total: £14,500

Main draw

 All matches had a 30-second shot clock with players having two 30 second time-outs per match.
 * A re-spotted black ball shootout replaced final frame deciders at 2–2.

Final

References 

World Seniors Tour
2017 in snooker
2017 in English sport
Snooker competitions in England
Sport in Surrey
October 2017 sports events in the United Kingdom